Charlotte Chantal Solange Caniggia Nannis (born 15 February 1993) is an Argentine model, social media influencer, showgirl and media personality. She is the daughter of retired professional footballer Claudio Caniggia with retired model Mariana Nannis; her twin brother is Alexander Caniggia, also a media personality.

Biography 
Her television appearances started in 2010 when she took part, with her mother Mariana Nannis, in Mujeres ricas aired in 2010 by La Sexta in Spain; in 2012 she participated in the eight season of the Marcelo Tinelli's Bailando por un Sueño in Argentina; in 2015 she took part (with Cecilia Rodriguez, Fanny Neguesha, Cristina Buccino, Alex Belli and others contestants) in the tenth season of the Italian reality show L'isola dei famosi (Celebrity Survivor Italy) hosted by Alessia Marcuzzi with Alvin on Canale 5; in early 2016 she took part in the fourth season of the Spanish reality show Gran Hermano VIP aired by Telecinco: later, in the same year (2016) she participated as a contestant again in the Marcelo Tinelli's dance program, in that year named Bailando 2016 and aired by El Trece.

She hosted, from 18 September 2017 to 29 July 2019, in MTV Latinoamérica her docu-reality programme MTV Caniggia Libre with her twin brother Alexander Caniggia, also a media personality. In 2019, Charlotte and Alex took part in the Chilean reality show RE$I$TIRÉ and in the same year she took part (alone, without her twin brother) in the Argentinian reality show hosted by Tinelli Showmatch: Super Bailando 2019. In early 2020 she took part in the Argentinian program Divina comida aired by Telefe; later, in the same year she was a contestant of the Argentinian reality show Cantando 2020 aired by El Trece; in early 2021 she took part in the Acapulco Shore: The family back in Acapulco, a Mexican television programme aired by MTV Latinoamérica; later, during that year (2021), firstly she took part in the Marcello Tinelli's dance program Showmatch: La Academia (aired by El Trece) and secondly, at the end of 2021, in the third season of MasterChef Celebrity (aired by Telefe).

Filmography

Television

Cinema

Awards and nominations

References

 

1993 births
Living people
Argentine female models
Argentine expatriates in Italy
People from Buenos Aires
Participants in Italian reality television series
21st-century Argentine women
Participants in Argentine reality television series
Bailando por un Sueño (Argentine TV series) participants